Robert Dean Jones (born August 25, 1945) is a former American football wide receiver. He played for the Chicago Bears from 1967-1968 and for the Atlanta Falcons in 1969.

After his football career, Jones attended law school and became a licensed attorney in the State of California.  Jones went on to become a highly respected Deputy District Attorney for the County of Orange, California.  He fought for justice and prosecuted countless criminals with the same relentless tenacity that made him a formidable force on the football field.

References

1945 births
Living people
American football wide receivers
San Diego State Aztecs football players
Chicago Bears players
Atlanta Falcons players